Nebush Nunatak (‘Nunatak Nebush’ \'nu-na-tak 'ne-bush\) is the mostly ice-free rocky ridge extending 1.54 km in north-south direction and 1.1 km wide, rising to 913 m on the west side of Elgar Uplands in northern Alexander Island, Antarctica. It surmounts Nichols Snowfield to the west and its tributary Delius Glacier to the east. The vicinity was visited on 30 January 1988 by the geological survey team of Christo Pimpirev and Borislav Kamenov (First Bulgarian Antarctic Expedition), and Philip Nell and Peter Marquis (British Antarctic Survey).

British mapping in 1971. The feature is named after the megalithic monument of Nebush in Southwestern Bulgaria.

Location

Maps
 British Antarctic Territory. Scale 1:200000 topographic map. DOS 610 – W 69 70. Tolworth, UK, 1971
 Antarctic Digital Database (ADD). Scale 1:250000 topographic map of Antarctica. Scientific Committee on Antarctic Research (SCAR). Since 1993, regularly upgraded and updated

Notes

References
 Bulgarian Antarctic Gazetteer. Antarctic Place-names Commission. (details in Bulgarian, basic data in English)
 Nebush Nunatak. SCAR Composite Gazetteer of Antarctica

External links
 Nebush Nunatak. Copernix satellite image

Nunataks of Alexander Island
Bulgaria and the Antarctic